Bruce Gillespie (born 1947) is a prominent Australian science fiction fan best known for his long-running sf fanzine SF Commentary. Along with Carey Handfield and Rob Gerrand, he was a founding editor of Norstrilia Press, which published Greg Egan's first novel. 
 
He was fan guest of honour at Aussiecon 3, the 57th World Science Fiction Convention held in Melbourne, Australia in 1999.

He has won and been nominated for many Ditmar Awards since his first nomination in 1970, and in 2007 he was awarded the Chandler Award for his services to science fiction fandom.

Major Fanzines

SF Commentary (1969 – ) – three times nominated for a Hugo Award for Best Fanzine
The Metaphysical Review (1984 – )
Steam Engine Time (2000–2013)
Treasure (2013 – )

Awards
Hugo Award for Best Fanzine 1972, SF Commentary, nominated
Hugo Award for Best Fanzine 1973, SF Commentary, nominated
Hugo Award for Best Fanzine 1975, SF Commentary, nominated
Ditmar Award Best Australian Fanzine 1970, SF Commentary, nominated
Ditmar Award Best Australian Fanzine 1971, SF Commentary, nominated
Ditmar Award Best Australian Fanzine 1972, SF Commentary, winner
Ditmar Award Best Australian Fanzine 1973, SF Commentary, winner
Ditmar Award Best Australian Fanzine 1977, SF Commentary, winner
Ditmar Award Best Australian Fanzine 1980, SF Commentary, winner
Ditmar Award William Atheling Jr Award 1980, The Man Who Filled the Void and By Our Fruits, SF Commentary 55/56, nominated
Ditmar Award Best Australian Fanzine 1981, SF Commentary, nominated
Ditmar Award Best Australian Fanzine 1982, SF Commentary, nominated
Ditmar Award William Atheling Jr Award 1982, Sing a Song of Daniel, winner
Ditmar Award Best Australian SF or Fantasy Editor 1983, Norstilia Press, nominated with Carey Handfield and Rob Gerrand
Ditmar Award William Atheling Jr Award 1983, SF Commentary: The First Year, nominated
Ditmar Award Best Australian SF or Fantasy Editor 1984, Norstilia Press, nominated with Carey Handfield and Rob Gerrand
Ditmar Award Best Australian SF or Fantasy Editor 1985, nominated
Ditmar Award Best Australian Fanzine 1986, Metaphysical Review, winner
Ditmar Award Best Australian Fanwriter 1986, nominated
Ditmar Award Best Australian Fanzine 1987, Metaphysical Review, nominated
Ditmar Award Best Australian Fanwriter 1989, winner
Ditmar Award Best Australian Fanwriter 1990, winner
Ditmar Award Best Australian Fanwriter 1991, winner
Ditmar Award William Atheling Jr Award 1991, The Non-SF Novels of Philip K. Dick presented at the Nova Mob and published in ANZAPA, winner
Ditmar Award Best Australian Fanwriter 1992, winner
Ditmar Award William Atheling Jr Award 1992, Jonathan Carroll, Storyteller, nominated
Ditmar Award William Atheling Jr Award 1993, James Morrow and the Erni, nominated
Ditmar Award Best Australian Fanwriter 1994, winner
Ditmar Award Best Australian Fanzine 1996, Metaphysical Review, nominated
Ditmar Award Best Australian Fanwriter 1997, winner
Ditmar Award Best Australian Fanwriter 1998, nominated
Ditmar Award Best Australian Fanzine 1999, Metaphysical Review, winner
Ditmar Award Best Australian Fanwriter 2000, nominated
Ditmar Award Best Australian Fanwriter 2001, nominated
Ditmar Award Best Australian Fan Production 2001, The Unrelenting Gaze: SF Commentary #76, nominated
Ditmar Award William Atheling Jr Award 2001, The Unrelenting Gaze: SF Commentary #76, nominated
Ditmar Award Best Australian Fanwriter 2002, winner
Ditmar Award Best Australian Fan Production, Fanzine 2002, SF Commentary, winner
Ditmar Award Best Australian Fanwriter 2004, winner
Ditmar Award William Atheling Jr Award 2004, winner
Ditmar Award Best Australian Fanwriter 2005, winner
Ditmar Award Best Australian Fanwriter 2006, nominated
Chandler Award, 2007, winner
Ditmar Award Best Australian Fanzine 2008, Steam Engine Time, nominated

External links
Fan Guest of Honor Speech, Aussiecon 3 
Issues of The Metaphysical Review on eFanzines.com 
Issues of SF Commentary on eFanzines.com 
Issues of Steam Engine Time on eFanzines.com 
Issues of Science Fiction magazine edited by Van Ikin

Book References
Divine Invasions: A Life of Philip K. Dick by Lawrence Sutin 
Gateways to Forever: The Story of the Science-Fiction Magazines from 1970 to 1980: The History of the Science-Fiction Magazine by Michael Ashley 
How Much Does Chaos Scare You? by Aaron Barlow 
PKD: A Philip K. Dick Bibliography by Daniel J. H. Levack, Steven Owen Godersky 
Science-fiction Studies by Dept. of English, Indiana State University 
A Stanislaw Lem Reader by Stanislaw Lem, Peter Swirski 
Supernatural Fiction Writers: Contemporary Fantasy and Horror by Richard Bleiler 
Transrealist Fiction by Damien Broderick 
Twentieth-century American Literature by Harold Bloom

References

External links 

 
 

1947 births
Australian speculative fiction critics
Australian speculative fiction editors
Science fiction critics
Living people
Australian literary critics